Eumacaria is a monotypic moth genus in the family Geometridae described by Packard in 1873. Its only species, Eumacaria madopata, the brown-bordered geometer moth, was first described by Achille Guenée in 1857. It is found in North America, where it has been recorded from British Columbia, northern Washington, southern Saskatchewan, from Maine to Florida, South Dakota, North Dakota, Nebraska, Wyoming, Idaho, Colorado and New Mexico. The habitat consists of orchards and shrublands. The species is listed as threatened in Connecticut.

The wingspan is 20–25 mm. The wings are grey with fine antemedial, median and postmedial lines. The marginal third of the wings is brown, with a row of submarginal dark spots on the forewings. Adults are on wing from early June to early July in the north and from April to September in the south. There is one generation per year.

The larvae feed on Prunus species (including Prunus pensylvanica and Prunus serotina) as well as Pyrus.

References

External links

Macariini
Monotypic moth genera
Moths of North America